Nangzhik Monastery (locally pronounced "Narshi" or "Nogi"), formerly known by several other names, is a monastery of the Bon religion in Amdo, modern Ngawa Town, Sichuan, China. It is about a  walk up a shortcut to reach the monastery on a hill to the north of the town. On a hill to the east is another Bon monastery named Togden or Topgyel which has a large stupa nearby.

History
Founded in 1108 as Gyelten Püntsok Monastery by Nyimadzin, it was moved to its present site in 1754.  It is a large monastery with about 800-1000 monks, and it is said to be the biggest Bon monastery in Tibet. Nangzhik is a branch of Nogi (Duiansi) at Changla in Songpan County.

A history of the monastery was published in 1994.

Footnotes

References
 Dorje, Gyurme (2009). Footprint Tibet Handbook. Footprint Books. .
 Kotan Publishing (2000). Mapping the Tibetan World. Kotan Publishing, 2004 reprint. .

External links
 Picassa photos: 
 Collection of Bon texts from Nangshik Monastery

Bon
Buildings and structures in Sichuan
1107 establishments in Asia
Religious buildings and structures completed in 1754
Tourist attractions in Sichuan
1754 establishments in China
12th-century establishments in China